Stephanie Vogt was the defending champion, but lost in the first round to Justine Ozga.

Sandra Záhlavová won the title, defeating Lesley Kerkhove 7–5, 7–6(7–5) in the final.

Seeds

Draw

Finals

Top half

Bottom half

References
 Main Draw
 Qualifying Draw

TEAN International - Singles
2012 Women's Singles